was a district located in Fukuoka Prefecture, Japan.

As of 2003, the district had an estimated population of 46,540 and a density of 620.62 persons per square kilometer. The total area was 74.99 km2.

Former towns and villages
Nakagawa

Mergers
 On October 1, 2018, the town of Nakagawa was elevated to city status. Chikushi District was dissolved as a result of this merger.

References

Former districts of Fukuoka Prefecture